Melanie Rhonda Gibbons (born 18 September 1978) is an Australian politician who is a member of the New South Wales Legislative Assembly representing Holsworthy for the Liberal Party since 2015, and Menai from 2011 to 2015.

Early years and background
Gibbons was born and raised in Woronora in the Sutherland Shire and worked as a real estate agent before becoming a development manager for Technical Aid to the Disabled. She also formerly worked for various state and federal politicians.

Political career
Elected to the Sutherland Shire Council in 2004 as an independent candidate, Gibbons was, at one stage, deputy mayor.

Having previously sought endorsement in 2007, Gibbons was endorsed as a candidate for the Liberal Party in 2010. At the March 2011 elections, Gibbons was elected and received a swing of 27.1 points, winning 74.4 per cent of the two-party vote.  She won 61 percent of the primary vote, enough to win the seat without the need for preferences. Alison Megarrity, the incumbent Labor member, did not seek re-election. Gibbons' main competitor was Peter Scaysbrook. Menai was among the first seats claimed as won by the Coalition on election night; according to Gibbons, it was the very first seat the Coalition took from Labor in its landslide victory.

In 2012, Gibbons pleaded guilty and was sentenced, without a recorded conviction, for failure to comply with Election Funding Authority regulations regarding the submission of political donation returns for 2010, when she was a Sutherland Shire Councillor.

For the 2015 NSW Election, the New South Wales Electoral Commission undertook the process of redistributing electoral boundaries. In this process, Gibbons' seat of Menai was abolished, and replaced with the redrawn seat of Holsworthy, encompassing more of the City of Liverpool than previously. Gibbons won the new seat with a reduced margin of 6.7%, despite a 4% swing to Labor.

When first elected in 2011, Gibbons served as a Temporary Speaker in the Legislative Assembly. After the 2015 election, in addition to her Temporary Speaker position, Gibbons also was appointed the Chair of the Committee for Children and Young People and as the Chair of the Joint Standing Committee on the Office of the Valuer-General.

At the 2019 state election, Gibbons retained the seat of Holsworthy.

On 13 October 2021 Gibbons announced her intention to resign from state parliament in order to stand for the federal seat of Hughes. Gibbons was not selected as the Liberal candidate for Hughes in April 2022 and remains the member for Holsworthy.

Controversy 
In June 2018, media reported that Gibbons had "skipped question time" to attend a "local branch meeting".

In April 2019, the Sydney Morning Herald reported that members of Gibbons's staff had edited her Wikipedia page to promote a favourable political image, following her promotion within the Berejiklian ministry.

See also

Women in the New South Wales Legislative Assembly

References

 

|-

Liberal Party of Australia members of the Parliament of New South Wales
1978 births
Living people
Members of the New South Wales Legislative Assembly
Australian real estate agents
21st-century Australian politicians
Women members of the New South Wales Legislative Assembly
21st-century Australian women politicians